Squeaking Point is a locality and small rural community in the local government area of Latrobe in the North West region of Tasmania.
The 2016 census determined a population of 223 for the state suburb of Squeaking Point.

History
The name dates from the early days of settlement. It was given to the area because of the noise made by some pigs that escaped from a ship. The official name was changed from “Moriarty” to Squeaking Point in 1948, and the locality was gazetted in 1967.

Geography
The waters of the Rubicon Estuary form the eastern boundary.

Road infrastructure
The C708 route (Woodbury Lane / Parkers Ford Road) runs through the locality from south to west. Route C709 (two separate roads) starts at two intersections with C708. Squeaking Point Road runs south-west before exiting, and Charles Street runs east to the shore of Rubicon Estuary.

References

Localities of Latrobe Council
Towns in Tasmania